Bob Hawke College is a public high school in the City of Subiaco and situated in the suburb of Subiaco, Western Australia. The school opened on 3 February 2020 with 250 Year 7 students, and is scheduled to expand to 1,500–2,000 students from Years 7 to 12 in 2025.

The school integrates the playing surface of the former Subiaco Oval stadium into its campus, which was demolished in December 2019. The refurbished oval was open to students in May 2020, and to the general public the following month.

History 
In 2017, the government of Western Australian proposed to move students from Perth Modern School to a new high-rise building in the Perth central business district. This proposal was opposed by many members of the Perth Modern School community. On 13 June 2017, the plan was changed to instead build a new school at Mueller Park, which is close to Perth Modern School. The new college is expected to take pressure off Churchlands Senior High School, Mount Lawley Senior High School, Shenton College and Dianella Secondary College. During its planning and early construction, the college was known as Inner City College. After the death of Bob Hawke in May 2019, the school was confirmed to be named in honour of him. The school's Principal is John Burke and the Associate Principals are Kara Beecham and Adrian Lee.

References

External links

Bob Hawke
Educational institutions established in 2020
Public high schools in Perth, Western Australia
Subiaco, Western Australia
2020 establishments in Australia